Penicillium udagawae is an anamorph species of fungus in the genus Penicillium.

References

udagawae
Fungi described in 1972